Barobisha( also known as Barovisha or Barabisa) is a village located on the National Highway 31C, towards Assam, in the Alipurduar district of West Bengal.It is 8 km away from the Bengal-Assam border. Barobisha comes under the Kumargram community development block. The gram panchayats of Kumargram block/ panchayat samiti are: Chengmari, Kamakhyaguri I, Kamakhyaguri II, Khoardanga I, Khoardanga II, Kumargram, Newland, Kumargram Sankosh, Rydak, Turturi Khanda, Valka Barovisha I and Valka Barovisha II.

Barobisha is the entrance to exotic locations like Newlands Tea Garden, Rasikbil migratory bird sanctuary West Bengal, Kalikhola, Geylegphug, and Phuntsholing Bhutan. The place is famous for its Marathon football league and Kali-mela (the fair on the eve of Goddess Kali worship). To its north lies Bhutan hills, south lies Bangladesh and east lies Assam state. Raidak and Sankosh (Wang Chhu and Tsang Chu in Bhutan) are two rivers on the west and east sides of the place. Currently the major portion of Barobisha is getting a massive facelift as it has been demolished on 7 December 2010 due to reconstruction for the National Highway expansion project, which was almost complete by July 2014.

Nearest Town Kamakhyaguri

Location
 Latitude: 26.4679 North
 Longitude: 89.8048 East
 Pin Code: 736207
 Outpost: Barobisha
 District: Alipurduar
 Nearest City: Alipurduar
 State: West Bengal (North)
 Subtropical plains

Major localities
Barobisha bazar and Montala মনতলা, Howlipotty, Christian math, NWGEL Church and Laskar Para, Radhanagar and Laal School, JNV ( Jawahar Navodaya Vidyalaya ) CBSE School, Chakchaka চকচকা & New town, Satsang mandir সৎসঙ্গ মন্দির & Dakshin rampur, Bawt-tola বটতলা and Shalbagan শালবাগান, commercial sales tax office at Assam gate & Shantibon.
The nearest railway station to the South is Jorai and nearest Hospital to the North is Laal School (towards Bhutan Hills).

The nearest railway station Kamakhyaguri Railway Station and nearest Hospital Kamakhyaguri Rural Hospital

Occupation
Most of the people are farmers and the next generations rely on business like timber, construction works, fishing, vegetable, and retail clothing. Assam-Bengal Commercial/Sales Tax office used to provide a large number of jobs. But post GST regime, Jorai and it's neighbour Barobisha have witnessed massive unemployment due to the unification in taxes and abolishing of State sales Tax gate, which would otherwise serve many people a source of income. Computer learning centres, Kindergarten & Montessori schools, state government jobs and agriculture provide other job opportunities.

Cultural activities
Cultural activities started with the emergence of Natyam নাট্যম-the drama club and "Udaisree Sangha" in the 1980s and was further geared up by the "Pratyusha প্রত্যুষা Cultural Unit" with their annual drama festival. After a long gap, অন্তরীক্ষ নাট্য একাদেমি Antarikshya Natya Academy has become the torch bearer. Geetanjali Sangeet Mahavidyalaya, Sur-O-Chhondo Kalakendra are the renowned Music Institutes since a long time.  Apart from that, Dishari, Bawt-tola (or Battala) বটতলা, ছন্নছাড়া, Swadhin-Bharat, New-town, Man-tola (মনতলা), Friends Union Club and Netaji Sangha (নেতাজী সংঘ)have also played a considerable role in cultural activities.
The local cable news network Ex TV Bangla) broadcasts a Sunday news bulletin. Local newspapers like Simanto Barta and Volka Samachar, edited by eminent literary persona the late Shantonu lahiri (Volka Samachar presently being published by his widow, M/s Dipali Bagchi) are reliable sources of information.

The Big 31 Feet Idol (একুশ হাত বড়কালী ঠাকুর)
It started in the year 1971 with a seven feet idol! Immediately after Laxmi Puja the construction work begins. It takes 14 days span and the active cooperation of 14 artisans. Famous cultural icon Late Manindra Pal had been involved with this idol making since the beginning. In his absence, his able son and other prominent idol makers are carrying the legacy. This Kali idol and an 11 days fair (কালীমেলা) attracts huge crowd every year, though due to the Corona Pandemic, this has been stopped since last 2 years!

Sports initiatives
Barobisha has a strong and inspiring sports heritage, football in particular. The marathon football league held every year on the eve of Independence day which witnesses a massive upsurge of spectators around the district or its neighbourhood area. However, with the advent of cricket in the 1990s, the craze for football has been reduced considerably.

Tourist guide
From here one can visit forests like Chilapata, Rajabhatkhawa, Khutimari, Nimti, Tiamarighat, Dhumpara, Newlands tea garden, and Shill-Bunglow.

The following info may be helpful for tourists:

1. Hotels, Lodges & Resorts are available here for dine-in and night stay.

2. China-made small, lucrative toys and utilities (imported from Siliguri Hong-Kong market and Dhulabari) are readily available here.

3. Rasikbil রসিকবিল migratory bird sanctuary, near Kamakhyaguri

4. Kalikhola, Bhutan, Shil Bungalow - Purba Shalbari are good picnic spots

5. Barobisha: Bawt-tola (or Battala/বটতলা) Shaal-Bagan (collection of a large number of Shorea Robusta or Shaal trees).

6. Buxa tiger reserve is just 60 km away from Barobisha.
The nearest railway station, Kamakhyaguri, (although Jorai station is 2 km away but it is not the stoppage for important trains) is just 7 km away which connects to New Alipurduar, New Jalpaiguri, Howrah/Kolkata.

7. The nearest airport is Bagdogra-179 km away, near Siliguri. Guahati airport is 267 km away.
One can see and use Bhutanese currency Ngultrum here.

8. Boirali maach (বৈরালী মাছ): The rare fishes of Himalyan foothills - Danio rerio, Danio dangila and Barilius Barila are available in Raidak, Jorai and Sankosh river. Boirali fish derives its nutrition from microscopic Dufnia, Cyclop or from green algae Spirogyra or Volvox. These fishes are nowadays facing the crisis of extinction due to water pollution, excess use of pesticides and the frequent vibration caused by dynamite explosions in the hills. (Web page developed by Sudipto Ghosh)

9. Jawahar Navodaya Vidyalaya

10. Central government funded boarding school Jawahar Navodaya Vidyalaya, Barobisha is located one km west of city center on NH 27, near Raidāk II river.

External Sources
সংবাদ প্রতিদিন https://www.sangbadpratidin.in/religion/31-feet-kali-idol-major-attraction-for/

Bird's Eye view: https://m.facebook.com/story.php?story_fbid=1831645050559061&id=100011407516360

Cities and towns in Alipurduar district

Barobisha Facebook page https://www.facebook.com/barobisha.wb/]]